Greg Baxtrom is an American head chef based in Brooklyn, New York and worked at three of the world's top-ranked restaurants before opening his own restaurant as head chef.

Early life and education
Greg Baxtrom was born in Chicago, Illinois, United States, and graduated from Kendall College.

Career
Baxtrom has worked in kitchens across the world, including Alinea, Blue Hill at Stone Barns, Per Se, and Lysverket in Norway before opening in 2016 his first restaurant, which he named Olmsted, in Prospect Heights. Olmsted offers a seasonal vegetable-forward menu with produce from the restaurant's backyard garden as well as from local farmers and purveyors.

Awards and reception
His restaurant has received positive reviews, including in  the “Top New York Restaurants in 2016” from The New York Times,  “Restaurant of the Year” from Eater in 2016, “Restaurant of the Year” from Food & Wine in 2017, “America’s Best New Restaurant” from Bon Appétit in 2017, “Best New Restaurant in America” from Esquire in 2017,  and “Where to Eat in 2017” from New York Magazine. Olmsted has also appeared on Best-of-the-Year lists in publications such as The New Yorker, Forbes, and Conde Nast Traveler, among many others.

Olmsted was a finalist for the James Beard Foundation Award for Best New Restaurant in 2017. Baxtrom was a semi-finalist for the James Beard Foundation Award for Best Chef: New York City in 2018.

In 2017, Baxtrom received the StarChefs Award for New York City Rising Star Chef.

References

External links
 
 

Year of birth missing (living people)
Living people
National Louis University alumni
Chefs from New York (state)
American male chefs
American restaurateurs